Princeville is a town in Edgecombe County, North Carolina, United States established by freed slaves after the Civil War. It was established in 1865 and known as Freedom Hill. It was incorporated in 1885 as Princeville, the first independently governed African American community chartered in the United States. 

Princeville is part of the Rocky Mount, North Carolina Metropolitan Statistical Area. As of the 2020 census, the town population was 1,254 residents. The town is on the opposite bank of the Tar River from Tarboro.

History
As the American Civil War reached its conclusion, formerly enslaved African Americans sought refuge at a temporary Union encampment south of Tarboro, North Carolina along the Tar River. These inhabitants developed their own makeshift settlement at the site and chose the name Freedom Hill in recognition of a small raised area where a Union soldier first announced the Emancipation Proclamation. In 1873, community member Turner Prince joined his companions in purchasing portions of the land and used his carpentry skills to begin building permanent homes. This created a kind of racialized topography with the black community on a swampy floodplain and white citizens on safer land above. White land owners made no effort to protest the black residents' presence, since they found the swampy terrain to be of little use, and preferred to have them kept away from white residents in Tarboro. Some of the landowners eventually sold their holdings to the black residents. Viewing state recognition as an important next step in establishing their identity as free citizens, the community successfully petitioned the North Carolina Legislature for incorporation in 1885. Despite requests to choose a name memorializing President Garfield, the new town instead called itself Princeville to honor its founder.

During Reconstruction, the town pursued educational opportunities and worked with Henry C. Cherry, one of the first black representatives serving in the North Carolina Legislature, to request a schoolteacher from the American Missionary Association. Robert S. Taylor soon arrived and began service as an educator and important community leader with a career including terms as a county justice of the peace and state senator. In 1880, the town's population was primarily engaged in nonagricultural occupations with a skilled workforce including, carpenters, masons, blacksmiths, nurses, and six schoolteachers. The Princeville Graded School, the town's public school, held its first classes in 1883 and began organizing graduation exercises by 1909.

Princeville faced challenges throughout the Jim Crow era. In the opening years of the 20th century, white business owners launched unsuccessful attempts to either dissolve or seize control of the town. By the end of World War I, more than half of the town's inhabitants moved to northern cities as part of the Great Migration seeking economic opportunities and an escape from white supremacy. In 1967 the U.S. Army Corps of Engineers built a levee in the town to protect it from flooding. In February 1997 the North Carolina Local Government Commission assumed control over the town's finances, the first time it had ever taken over the finances of a municipality.      

The town also suffered continuing difficulties due to its low elevation and adjacency to the Tar River. Princeville experienced severe flooding in September 1999 when Cape Verde-type Hurricane Floyd pulled coffins from the cemetery and raised water levels to just below the height of rooftops and church steeples. The U.S. Federal Emergency Management Agency offered to buy out all residences in the town, but municipal officials rejected the offer. In October 2016, Category 5 Atlantic Hurricane Matthew struck the town with similarly devastating results leaving residents with a decision between rebuilding and moving elsewhere. As the town's population declined in wake of the natural disasters, its tax base shrunk and the county government assumed various responsibilities from the municipality, including authority over tax collection, policing, and water and sewer services. In 2020, the Army Corps of Engineers announced $39.6 million in funding for a levee project to protect Princeville from future storms.

Tourism 
As the first town chartered by blacks in the United States, Princeville is home to several locations of historical interest. In 1999, students from North Carolina State University created a mobile museum for exhibits showcasing the town's unique heritage. Historic buildings include the Abraham Wooten House, the Mount Zion Primitive Baptist Church, and the Princeville School, which was listed on the National Register of Historic Places in 2001.

Financial Difficulties 
In a rare move, the State Treasurer's Office took control of the books for financially strapped Princeville in 1997 and July 2012. In September 2021, a comprehensive town plan was adopted with emphases on resiliency, self-sufficiency, and economic growth.

Geography
Princeville is located at  (35.886974, -77.520584).

Demographics

2020 census

As of the 2020 United States census, there were 1,254 people, 789 households, and 556 families residing in the town.

2000 census
The 2000 census data reflect the town shortly after 1999's Hurricane Floyd; a 2004 census recount had been conducted, doubling the town's reported population (see above).

As of the census of 2000, there were 940 people, 346 households, and 255 families residing in the town. The population density was 590.5 people per square mile (228.3/km). There were 761 housing units at an average density of 478.0 per square mile (184.8/km). The racial makeup of the town was 97.45% African American, 2.23% White, 0.11% Asian, and 0.21% from two or more races. Hispanic or Latino of any race were 0.64% of the population.

There were 346 households, out of which 27.2% had children under the age of 18 living with them, 40.5% were married couples living together, 27.5% had a female householder with no husband present, and 26.3% were non-families. 24.3% of all households were made up of individuals, and 10.1% had someone living alone who was 65 years of age or older. The average household size was 2.72 and the average family size was 3.21.

In the town, the population was spread out, with 25.9% under the age of 18, 8.6% from 18 to 24, 24.9% from 25 to 44, 29.9% from 45 to 64, and 10.7% who were 65 years of age or older. The median age was 38 years. For every 100 females, there were 81.5 males. For every 100 females age 18 and over, there were 76.9 males.

The median income for a household in the town was $31,667, and the median income for a family was $35,625. Males had a median income of $23,281 versus $19,886 for females. The per capita income for the town was $12,603. About 14.0% of families and 17.6% of the population were below the poverty line, including 30.9% of those under age 18 and 20.7% of those age 65 or over.

References

External links
 Town of Princeville official website
 Documentary on Princeville: This Side of the River
 Documentary on Princeville: Freedom Hill

Towns in Edgecombe County, North Carolina
Towns in North Carolina
Populated places established in 1865
Rocky Mount metropolitan area
Populated places in North Carolina established by African Americans